The Koolhoven F.K.48 was an airliner built in the Netherlands in 1934 for KLM.

Design and development
The F.K.48 was a conventional, semi-cantilever high-wing monoplane, powered by two engines mounted on the wing leading edges. The undercarriage was of fixed, tailskid type with divided main units. The fuselage was of welded steel tube construction, covered in fabric, which was oval in cross section at the nose, transitioning to a rectangular cross-section for the passenger cabin. The wings were wooden structures skinned in plywood.

The sole example built was registered PH-AJX and quickly gained the nickname Ajax. It was used by KLM on the Rotterdam-Eindhoven route until 1936, when it was retired to training and instructional duties within the airline.

Specifications

References

Further reading

External links

 Koolhoven Aeroplanes Foundation
 Уголок неба

FK.48
1930s Dutch airliners
Aircraft first flown in 1934
High-wing aircraft
Twin-engined tractor aircraft